CM and StP Railroad Underpass is a historic structure located southwest of Washington, Iowa, United States.  It was listed on the National Register of Historic Places in 1998.  The Warren deck truss bridge is a rare example of this type of bridge in Iowa, and the oldest still in existence.  Given the relatively flat nature of Iowa's rivers and streams this bridge type was rarely built in the state, and was mostly built for railroad use.  This bridge, completed in 1903 by the Chicago, Milwaukee, St. Paul & Pacific Railroad (known as simply The Milwaukee Road), crosses a county highway bridge and the west fork of Crooked Creek.

References

Bridges completed in 1903
Railroad bridges on the National Register of Historic Places in Iowa
Truss bridges in Iowa
Buildings and structures in Washington County, Iowa
National Register of Historic Places in Washington County, Iowa
1903 establishments in Iowa
Warren truss bridges in the United States
Chicago, Milwaukee, St. Paul and Pacific Railroad